

Brief history 
The Tasmanian Softball Council inc. was formed in 1954, attending their first National Championship that same year.

Some 50 years onwards the Tasmanian Softball Council inc. has 4 Affiliated members.

Yearly events 
The Tasmanian Softball Council inc. holds a number or annual events;
State Championships which are held over 3 weekends:
Weekend 1
Under 14 Girls
Under 16 Boys
Under 19 Women
Weekend 2
Under 14 Boys
Under 16 Girls
Under 19 Men's
Weekend 3
Open Women (A and B grades)
Open Men's

State teams 
The Tasmanian Softball Council attends most ASF National Championships

For the 2006 Championships the following was entered
Under 16 Girls
Under 16 Boys
Under 19 Women's
Under 19 Men's
The last Open Men's teams was entered in 2005
The last Open Women's team was entered in 2004
The last Under 23 Women's team was entered in 2005
A Under 23 Menas team has never been entered by the Tasmanian Softball Councill

Associations 
Great Northern League
Northern Tasmania Softball Association
Ulverston Softball Association
Other Leagues
Latrobe Softball Association
Southern Tasmania Softball Association

See also 
Australian Softball Federation
ASF National Championships

External links 
Tasmanian Softball Council inc.
Australian Softball Federation
International Softball Federation

Softball governing bodies in Australia
Sof